Michael O'Brien (born 25 July 1980) is a former Australian rules footballer in the Australian Football League.

He was recruited to the West Coast Eagles in the 1998 AFL Draft and struggled for consistency in his time at the club, playing just 2 games in the 2000 season.

During his time at the Eagles he played 16 games for WAFL club East Perth and was a member of their 2000 premiership team.

References

External links 

West Coast Eagles players
East Perth Football Club players
1980 births
Living people
Australian rules footballers from Victoria (Australia)
Bendigo Pioneers players